Syncrossus is a genus of six loaches, many of which are popular in the aquarium fish trade. They are primarily found in Southeast Asia, but S. berdmorei also occurs marginally outside this region in far northeastern India. It is one of eight genera in its family.

Species
The currently recognized species in this genus are:
 Syncrossus beauforti (H. M. Smith, 1931) (chameleon loach)
 Syncrossus berdmorei Blyth, 1860 (Blyth's loach)
 Syncrossus helodes (Sauvage, 1876) (lesser Katy Loach)
 Syncrossus hymenophysa (Bleeker, 1852) (green tiger loach)
 Syncrossus lucasbahi (Fowler, 1937)
 Syncrossus reversa (T. R. Roberts, 1989)

References

Botiidae
Freshwater fish genera
Taxa named by Edward Blyth